The 1892 Washington football team was an American football team that represented the University of Washington during the 1892 college football season. In its first season under W. B. Goodwin, the 1892 Washington team played two games, both against the Seattle Athletic Club. Washington lost the first game, 8–0, and won the second game, 14–0. The victory in the second game was the program's first win. Otto Collings was the team captain.

Schedule

References

Washington
Washington Huskies football seasons
Washington football